The Philippeion in the Altis of Olympia was an Ionic circular memorial in limestone and marble, a tholos, which contained chryselephantine (ivory and gold) statues of Philip's family: himself, Alexander the Great, Olympias, Amyntas III and Eurydice I. It was made by the Athenian sculptor Leochares in celebration of Philip's victory at the battle of Chaeronea (338 BC). It was the only structure inside the Altis dedicated to a human.

The temple consisted of an outer colonnade of Ionic order with 18 columns. Inside it had nine engaged columns of the lavishly designed Corinthian order. It had a diameter of 15 metres. The naos contained two windows, much like Hera II at Paestum. It had a carved marble roof which was decorated with a bronze poppy head on top.

The importance of the chryselephantine material used is that it was also the material used for the statue of Zeus at Olympia (comparing the Macedonian royal family to the gods). The fact that Alexander is represented here is also important, as Philip had seven wives, therefore after his death there very well could have been claims to the throne by people other than Alexander. By putting Alexander in the statue it makes it clear who the successor should be. It is however disputed whether or not Philip constructed this monument or whether Alexander had it constructed later, in which case the motives would be different.

Notes

References
Philippeion in Archaeopaedia
Philippeion in culture.gr''
Olympic victor monuments and Greek athletic art By Walter Woodburn Hyde Page 353  

4th-century BC establishments in Greece
Buildings and structures completed in the 4th century BC
Ancient Olympia
Ancient Greek buildings and structures
Culture of Macedonia (ancient kingdom)
Ancient art on Alexander the Great
Philip II of Macedon
Statue of Zeus at Olympia
Monuments and memorials in Greece